Argyrodes insectus is a species of spiders of the family Theridiidae that is endemic in Cape Verde. The species was first described by Günter E. W. Schmidt in 2005.

References

Further reading
Schmidt (2005) Neupublikation einiger von mir in "Arachnol. Mag." und "Tarantulas of the World" zwischen 2000 und 2005 veröffentlichten Arbeiten. Tarantulas of the World, vol. 110 (Sond.), p. 3-49.
Schmidt (2001) Argyrodes insectus sp. n. (Araneae: Theridiidae), eine Spezies von Cabo Verde. (Argytodes insectus sp n. (Araneae: Theridiidae), a Species of Cape Verde) Arachnologisches Magazin (Arachnological Magazine), vol. 9, no 5, p. 1-3.

Theridiidae
Spiders of Africa
Spiders described in 2005
Taxa named by Günter E. W. Schmidt
Arthropods of Cape Verde
Endemic fauna of Cape Verde